Dumbbell Island is a low rocky island lying  west of Alamode Island in the Terra Firma Islands, off the west coast of Graham Land. The island was surveyed in 1948 by the Falkland Islands Dependencies Survey, who so named it because of its shape.

See also 
 List of Antarctic and sub-Antarctic islands

References 

Islands of Graham Land
Fallières Coast